Alvin Lie, MSc. (Lie Ling Piao) is a member of People's Representative Council of Indonesia (Indonesia: Dewan Perwakilan Rakyat) as the representative of National Mandate Party (Indonesia: Partai Amanat Nasional).

He was born in Semarang, Central Java on April 21, 1961.  He spent his school age in Anglo Chinese School, Singapore. He later obtained his master's degree in International Marketing from Stratchclyde University Skotlandia in 1997.

Prior to his political career, he held a position as the director of PT Sarana Sehat Jamu; director of PT Allegori Semarang; director of PT Trans Pacific Trading Semarang, etc.

He is married to Inawati Rahardjo and has 3 children. Currently he lives in Jakarta, Indonesia.

References

1961 births
Living people
People from Semarang
Indonesian Hokkien people
Anglo-Chinese School alumni
Indonesian politicians of Chinese descent
National Mandate Party politicians